James Sharpe (1846 – October 30, 1935) was an English-born merchant and political figure in Ontario, Canada. He represented Parry Sound electoral district in the Legislative Assembly of Ontario as a Liberal member from 1890 to 1894.

He was born in Huntingdonshire, England, in 1846 and came to the Parry Sound area in 1871. Sharpe was the first reeve of Burk's Falls and operated a general store there. He was defeated in the 1894 election.

External links 
The Canadian parliamentary companion, 1891 JA Gemmill

1846 births
1935 deaths
Ontario Liberal Party MPPs
People from Parry Sound, Ontario